Igor Merino Cortazar (born 16 October 1990 in Balmaseda) is a Spanish cyclist, who is currently suspended from the sport after a positive drugs test for human growth hormone (HGH).

His younger sister Eider is also a professional cyclist.

Doping suspension
In July 2018, Merino was provisionally suspended by the UCI after testing positive to human growth hormone in an out of competition doping test on 13 June 2018. He was suspended for four years, lasting until June 2022.

Major results
2017
 4th Tour du Jura

References

External links

1990 births
Living people
Spanish male cyclists
Cyclists from the Basque Country (autonomous community)
Doping cases in cycling
Sportspeople from Biscay
People from Enkarterri